The Primer of Claude of France was the first book owned by the French princess Claude of France, eldest daughter of Louis XII of France and Anne of Brittany. Commissioned by Anne for Claude and produced in c. 1505, it is a rare surviving example of a manuscript designed for a medieval child.

The book measures 26 cm by 17.5 cm, and its 14 pages contain the text of the canonical hours shortened and simplified as a devotional elementary reading book or primer, along with two full-page miniature paintings – the first showing Claude kneeling before her patron saint Claudius of Besançon, with Saint Anne and the Virgin Mary in the right background, the second showing St Claudius presenting Claude to Saint Anne and the Virgin Mary – and 37 smaller miniatures. It is now held by the Fitzwilliam Museum in Cambridge as MS 159.

The "loose brushwork and relatively pale palette" and use of gilded frames of gothic architecture are typical of the Master of Antoine de Roche, who is tentatively identified with Guido Mazzoni of Modena (d. 1518).

See also
 Grandes Heures of Anne of Brittany

References

External links
The Primer of Claude de France (quaternio.ch)

Claude of France
Manuscripts of the Fitzwilliam Museum
16th-century illuminated manuscripts
1505 books
1505 in art